Claudia Riechsteiner (born 3 January 1986 in Sursee, Switzerland) is a Swiss ice hockey defender.

International career
Riechsteiner was selected for the Switzerland national women's ice hockey team in the 2010 Winter Olympics. She played in all five games, but did not register a point.

Riechsteiner has also appeared for Switzerland at two IIHF Women's World Championships at the Division I level. Her first appearance came in 2001.

Career statistics

International career

References

External links
Eurohockey.com Profile
Sports-Reference Profile

1986 births
Living people
Ice hockey players at the 2010 Winter Olympics
Olympic ice hockey players of Switzerland
People from Sursee District
Swiss women's ice hockey defencemen
Swiss Women's League players
Sportspeople from the canton of Lucerne